The Museum of contemporary art of Alcamo is located in Piazza Ciullo in Alcamo, inside the Ex Collegio dei Gesuiti, near the majestic Church of Jesus. The exhibition centre, large about 400 square metres, is on the first floor; at the entrance there are an information desk, a meeting room (the old chapel of Jesuits) and a bookshop.

History 

The museum was created in 2014 thanks to the municipal administration led by the Lord Mayor of that period, Dr. Sebastiano Bonventre M.D. In the following October they realized the ambitious project Creative Lab, an integrated system of cultural services aiming at the requalification of the urban space and supporting the development of the territory;  the municipality of Alcamo, the University of Palermo and the cooperatives Agrigest and Nido d’Argento.

On 28 February 2015,  there was the exhibition entitled  Art on loan, whose protagonists were Cielo d'Alcamo, Giacomo Serpotta and embroidery; the exposition, attended by the artistic director Enzo Fiammetta, has filled the new museum with  works from important museums, such as the Foundation Orestiadi di Gibellina, and from other Italian regions.

On 30 May 2015, the new museum presented the exhibition Ottocelle (that is Eight Cells): the title took  inspiration from the same configuration of the rooms which were the cells of the ex convent of Jesuits.  There were the works of four Italian artists (Elisa Nicolaci, Francesco De Grandi, Sergio Zavattieri and Luisa Mazza), the winners of the competition launched by the municipality of Alcamo, whose aim was the promotion of its territory through the production of works site specific that today belong to the patrimony of the museum.

In October  2016 they created a new arrangement of the museum that has also taken part in the XII Edition of the Contemporary's Day called by AMACI (Association of the Museums of Italian Contemporary Art).

Exhibition halls 

The museum is divided into various sections: the archaeological funds discovered on Mount Bonifato and in the  Castle of Calatubo, the paintings of Turi Simeti, Vito Bongiorno, Gisella Giovenco and Sergio Zavattieri, going right down to the plaster casts of Nicola Rubino, and works of other authors.

East wing 

There are these 8 exhibition halls:
 Cell I: four paintings (protrusions) by Turi Simeti, an exponent of spatialism, coming from Alcamo and living in Milan
 Cell II: Our Planet, Linea d’Ombra and Oltre; three paintings by Vito Bongiorno, an artist from Alcamo living and working in Rome
 Cell III: Loredana Mannina, Untitled (the table telling about Alcamo, 2015). 
 Cell IV: Elisa Nicolaci, Single. A creative adaptation (the part where the belly sleeps), 2015. 
 Rosario Bruno: Fragments of the Renaissance memory a tribute to Botticelli (1985-1994): a bas-relief 
 Luisa Mazza: Immagini di luce (images of light), 2015;  a work made up of different modules, the transparent cases keep “jewels of light”. It was dedicated to Alcamo, a town rich in history, sea and light, proud also of being the birthplace of  Cielo d'Alcamo, a very important reference for the Poetry of every period. 
 Cell V: Sergio Zavattieri: Pictures from Alcamo (2015), 33 stereoscopies which let you live an imaginary journey  into the past. 
 Cell VI: Francesco Surdi Something from 2015, plaster cast and other materials: in search of fragments of reality. 
 Cell VII: Roberto Romano, Sedimenta (2015) 
 Cell VIII: Francesco De Grandi, I cartelli, 2015 (A Tribute to Don Gaspano Canino, a puppet master from Alcamo)
Along the corridor there are the following works: 
 Two paintings by Sergio Zavattieri: Hemerocallis (2006) and Lilium candidum (2006), watercolours. 
 Two works by Francesco Fontana: Vie geometriche a colore (2015), oil and temperas on canvas.
 Two embroidered creations, made by skillful local embroiderers

South wing 
There are these eight exhibition halls: 
 Archaeological finds: first and second room.
 Scientific instrumentations: third room 
 Nicola Rubino, plaster cast sculptures: fourth and fifth room 
 Gisella Giovenco: seven paintings realized with silk intarsias and representing some churches in Alcamo; last room on the right.

Here is the list of Nicola Rubino's works in exhibition:
 Egyptian (of the Pharaoh) bather 
 Woman with a dove, realized in bronze 
 Mater Ecclesiae: made in bronze for the nunnery located in Via Vitellia in Rome 
 Bas-relief, openwork (cm.82x73) 
 Woman combing herself (cm.82x73) 
 Girl combing herself 
 Victor Emmanuel III’s head,  made in bronze for the Gallery Umberto I in Rome
 Bandaged goddess 
 Man bent over the dog 
 Woman holding a lamb on her arms 
 Couple of horses, realized in terracotta for the municipality of Venice 
 Woman combing herself
 Woman with a child on her shoulders 
 Stele 
 High relief, openwork (cm.36x38) 
 High relief, openwork (cm.36x38) 
 Mother with a child on her shoulders, realized in bronze 
 Bas-relief, with scenes of rural life 
 Justice, a bronze, realized for the courthouse of Bologna 
 Woman's head 
 Woman combing herself 
 Sculpted group with a winged horse 
 Bas-relief, openwork  
 Bas-relief (realized in bronze) 
 Woman's face (a figure)
The museum is open every day (Sundays included) from 9:30 to 12:30 and from 16:30 to 19:30.

References

Sources 
 http://www.alpauno.com/alcamo-nasce-il-museo-darte-contemporanea/#.V9bCAq2s9Z8
 http://www.alqamah.it/2014/07/25/nasce-il-museo-darte-contemporanea-ad-alcamo-ieri-linaugurazione/
 http://ilgiornaledellarte.com/articoli/2015/3/123505.html
 http://www.eventiculturalisicilia.it/index.php?cat=3&id=671
 http://www.exibart.com/notizia.asp?IDNotizia=45170&IDCategoria=79
 https://web.archive.org/web/20161221003543/http://www.cosedafareinsicilia.it/sito/2015/02/27/museo-darte-contemporanea-sinaugura-ad-alcamo-il-28-febbraio-ecco-i-contenuti/
 http://livesicilia.it/2015/02/27/riapre-il-collegio-dei-gesuiti-inaugura-art-on-loan_601503/
 http://www.alqamah.it/2015/02/25/da-ciullo-dalcamo-a-turi-simeti-con-art-on-loan-sabato-grand-opening-del-museo-darte-contemporanea-di-alcamo/
 http://www.tp24.it/2016/10/08/istituzioni/alcamo-il-15-ottobre-apre-il-nuovo-museo-di-arte-contemporanea/103708

External links 
 https://web.archive.org/web/20161220115232/https://signedevents.com/italy/alcamo/rosario-bruno-progetto-fondazione-fragile-alcamo-2016/
 https://web.archive.org/web/20161220082027/http://www.studentshow.com/gallery/43010753/Maca-Museo-dArte-Contemporanea-di-Alcamo-branding
 http://www.tp24.it/2016/10/08/istituzioni/alcamo-il-15-ottobre-apre-il-nuovo-museo-di-arte-contemporanea/103708
 https://www.behance.net/gallery/43881031/MACA-Museo-Darte-contemporanea-di-Alcamologo-contest
 https://www.facebook.com/pages/Museo-Darte-Contemporanea-Alcamo/330233380502929
 http://www.comune.alcamo.tp.it/
 https://web.archive.org/web/20170227220712/http://www.creativelabalcamo.it/mostre/
 http://www.trapaniok.it/12327/Cultura-trapani/alcamo-museo-d-arte-contemporanea-collegio-dei-gesuiti-inaugurazione-sabato-30-maggio-la-mostra-ottocelle#.V9bE3a2s9Z8
 https://web.archive.org/web/20180710054051/http://www.palermoviva.it/inaugurazione-museo-arte-contemporanea-in-sicilia/
 http://trapani.gds.it/2014/07/28/alcamo-apre-i-battenti-il-museo-d-arte-contemporanea-363657_230345/
 https://web.archive.org/web/20161220083359/http://www.ilcaleidoscopio.info/comunicati.aspx?idComunicato=09567510-2fd9-4482-a506-b12efe890457
 https://web.archive.org/web/20161220070009/http://www.telesud3.com/notiziaArchivio/?id=20531
 http://www.sergiozavattieri.com/eng/
 http://palermo.spazioblog.it/266748/+%93Art+on+loan%22+da+Ciullo+d%92Alcamo+a+Turi+Simeti.+L%26%2339%3Binaugurazione+sabato+28+febbraio+al+Museo+d%26%2339%3BArte+Contemporanea+di+Alcamo.html#.V9bR-a2s9Z8

See also 
 Sacred Art Museum
 Ethnographic Museum of Musical Instruments "Gaspare Cannone"
 Ex Jesuits' College
 List of Jesuit sites

Contemporary art galleries in Italy
Art museums and galleries in Sicily
Museums in Alcamo
Alcamo